This is a list of notable individuals and organizations who have voiced their endorsement of Michael Bloomberg's campaign for the Democratic Party's nomination for the 2020 U.S. presidential election.

Federal officials

White House officials

Former 
 Richard V. Spencer, former Secretary of the Navy (2017–2019) (Republican)

U.S. Representatives

Current 
 Harley Rouda, U.S. Representative from CA-48 since 2019
 Juan Vargas, U.S. Representative from CA-51 since 2013 (previously endorsed John Delaney)
 Scott Peters, U.S. Representative from CA-52 since 2013
 Stephanie Murphy, U.S. Representative from FL-07 since 2017 (previously endorsed Beto O'Rourke)
Ted Deutch, U.S. Representative from FL-19 (2010–2013), FL-21 (2013–2017) and FL-22 since 2017
Lucy McBath, U.S. Representative from GA-06 since 2019
 Bobby Rush, U.S. Representative from IL-01 since 1993 (previously endorsed Kamala Harris)
Haley Stevens, U.S. Representative from MI-11 since 2019
Josh Gottheimer, U.S. Representative from NJ-5 since 2017 (previously endorsed Cory Booker)
Mikie Sherrill, U.S. Representative from NJ-11 since 2019 (previously endorsed Cory Booker)
Gregory Meeks, U.S. Representative from NY-5 since 1998
Max Rose, U.S. Representative from NY-11 since 2019
Nita Lowey, U.S. Representative from NY-17 since 1989
Ben McAdams, U.S. Representative from UT-04 since 2019
 Stacey Plaskett, Delegate U.S. Representative from VI-at large since 2015 (previously endorsed Kamala Harris)

Former 
 Harold Ford Sr., former U.S. Representative from TN-09 (1975–1997)
 Gloria Negrete McLeod, former U.S. Representative from CA-35 (2013–2015)
 Mike Michaud, former U.S. Representative from ME-02 (2003–2015)
 Mark Schauer, former U.S. Representative from MI-07 (2009–2011)
 Tom Allen, former U.S. Representative from ME-01 (1997–2009)

State officials

Governors

Current 
 Gina Raimondo, Governor of Rhode Island (2015–2021)

Former 
Carlos Romero Barceló, Governor of Puerto Rico (1977–1985)
Brad Henry, Governor of Oklahoma (2003–2011)
Bev Perdue, Governor of North Carolina (2009–2013)
Jay Nixon, Governor of Missouri (2009–2017)

State executive officials

Former 
Alex Sink, former chief financial officer of Florida (2007–2011) and 2010 Democratic nominee for Governor of Florida and 2014 nominee for U.S. Representatives

State legislators

Current 
Michael Cusick, New York State Assembly since 2012
 Bobby Singleton, Minority Leader of the Alabama State Senate since 2019 and Alabama State Senator from District 24 since 2005; former Alabama State Representative from District 72 (2002–2005)
Cesar Chavez, State Representative, Arizona State Legislature, District 29
Jennifer Longdon, State Representative, Arizona State Legislature, District 24
 Richard Roth, California Senator from District 31 since 2012 (previously endorsed Kamala Harris)
 Tom Sullivan, Colorado State Representative from District 37 since 2019
Kionne McGhee, Minority Leader of the Florida House of Representatives since 2019 and Florida State Representative from District 117 since 2012
 Todd Kaminsky, New York Senator from District 9 since 2016
 Diane Savino, New York State Senate from District 23 since 2004
 Clyde Vanel, New York State Assemblyman from District 33 since 2016
Taylor Darling, New York State Assemblywoman from District 18 since 2019

Former 
 Ian Conyers, former Michigan State Senator from District 4 (2016–2018)

Local and municipal officials

Mayors

Current 
 Keith James, Mayor of West Palm Beach, Florida since 2019
Frank Scott Jr., Mayor of Little Rock, Arkansas since 2019 (previously endorsed Kamala Harris)
 Ethan Berkowitz, Mayor of Anchorage, Alaska since 2015
 Mary Salas, Mayor of Chula Vista, California since 2014
 Aja Brown, Mayor of Compton, California since 2013 (previously endorsed Kamala Harris)
 Serge Dedina, Mayor of Imperial Beach, California since 2014
 London Breed, Mayor of San Francisco, California since 2018; former acting Mayor (2017–2018) (previously endorsed Kamala Harris)
 Sam Liccardo, Mayor of San Jose, California since 2014 (previously endorsed Kamala Harris)
 Michael Tubbs, Mayor of Stockton, California since 2016.
 Greg Fischer, Mayor of Louisville, Kentucky since 2011
 Adrian Perkins, Mayor of Shreveport, Louisiana since 2018
 Ken Miyagishima, Mayor of Las Cruces, New Mexico since 2007
 Alan Webber, Mayor of Santa Fe, New Mexico since 2018
 Kathy Sheehan, Mayor of Albany, New York since 2014
Lovely Warren, Mayor of Rochester, New York since 2014
 Mike Spano, Mayor of Yonkers, New York since 2012
 Vi Lyles, Mayor of Charlotte, North Carolina since 2017
 Mary-Ann Baldwin, Mayor of Raleigh, North Carolina since 2019
 Dan Horrigan, Mayor of Akron, Ohio since 2016 (previously endorsed Tim Ryan)
 Stephen K. Benjamin, Mayor of Columbia, South Carolina since 2010
 Jim Strickland, Mayor of Memphis, Tennessee since 2016
 Sylvester Turner, Mayor of Houston, Texas since 2016
 Victoria Woodards, Mayor of Tacoma, Washington since 2018
 Muriel Bowser, Mayor of Washington, D.C. since 2015
 Bill Saffo, Mayor of Wilmington, North Carolina since 2007
 Brian Kulpa, Supervisor of Amherst, New York
 Former 
Virg Bernero, Mayor of Lansing, Michigan, former Democratic Party nominee for Governor of Michigan
Bob Buckhorn, Mayor of Tampa, Florida (2011–2019)
Michael B. Coleman, Mayor of Columbus, OHio (2000–2016) (previously endorsed Kamala Harris) Karl Dean, Mayor of Nashville, Tennessee (2007–2015) and 2018 Democratic nominee for Governor of Tennessee
 Manny Diaz, Mayor of Miami (2001–2009) (previously endorsed Joe Biden)David Dinkins, Mayor of New York City (1990–1993)
Bill Finch, Mayor of Bridgeport, Connecticut (2007–2015)
 Philip Levine, Mayor of Miami Beach, Florida (2013–2017)
Nancy McFarlane, Mayor of Raleigh, North Carolina (2011–2019)
Charles Meeker, Mayor of Raleigh, North Carolina (2001–2011)
 Michael Nutter, Mayor of Philadelphia (2008–2016) (previously endorsed Joe Biden)Stephanie Rawlings-Blake, Mayor of Baltimore, Maryland (2010–2016)
Antonio Villaraigosa, Speaker of the California Assembly (1998–2000), Majority Leader of the California Assembly (1996–1998), California Assemblyman from District 45 (1994–2000); Mayor of Los Angeles (2005–2013)
Karen Weaver, Mayor of Flint, Michigan (2015–2019)
 Andrew Young, former Mayor of Atlanta, Georgia (1982–1990), United States Ambassador to the United Nations (1977–1979), U.S. Representative from GA-05 (1973–1977)

 Municipal executive officials 
 Current 
 Steve Bellone, Suffolk County Executive since 2012
Warren Evans, Wayne County Executive since 2015
 Mike Thurmond, chief executive officer of DeKalb County since 2017
 Paul Vallone, member of New York City Council since 2014
 Joel Feroleto, member of Delaware, New York Council
 Former 
 C. Virginia Fields, former Borough President of Manhattan (1998–2005)
Diana Taylor, former New York Superintendent of Banks (2003–2007); Bloomberg's partner
 Claire Shulman, former Borough President of Queens (1986–1994)

 Party officials 

 DNC members 
 Current 

Khary Penebaker, DNC member and businessman (previously endorsed Cory Booker) Organisations 

Alabama Democratic Conference

 Notable individuals 

 Athletes and sports figures 
Tim Duncan, former NBA player for the San Antonio Spurs
Dhani Jones, former NFL player, television host
Gail Marquis, former basketball player who competed in the 1976 summer Olympics
Dara Torres, professional swimmer and Olympic champion

 Authors, activists and journalists 
Geoffrey Canada, educator, social activist, author, and President of the Harlem Children's Zone in Harlem, New York since 1990
 Sam Donaldson, former ABC News White House Correspondent and co-anchor of This Week Thomas Friedman, New York Times columnist, author

 Business leaders 
Barbara Corcoran, businesswoman, consultant and television personality, co-host of Shark TankPatricia Harris, CEO of Bloomberg Philanthropies and Bloomberg 2020 campaign chair
Jane Rosenthal, film producer
 Kevin Sheekey, businessman and political advisor; Bloomberg 2020 campaign manager
Paula Stone Williams, pastoral counselor and former president of the Christian church planting group Orchard Group (1989–2009)

 Entertainers and artists 
Lorraine Bracco, actress
Ted Danson, actor and producer
Michael Douglas, actor
Clint Eastwood, actor, film director and former mayor of Carmel-by-the-Sea, California (1986–1988) (Libertarian)
Tim Gunn, fashion consultant, television personality, actor, voice actor and author
John Mellencamp, musician and singer-songwriter
Bette Midler, actress
Isaac Mizrahi, fashion designer, TV presenter, and Chief Designer of the Isaac Mizrahi brand for Xcel Brands
Judy Sheindlin, star of Judge Judy, author, television personality, former Manhattan family court judge, civil court judge, and prosecutor
Sela Ward, actress
Sam Waterston, actor

 Newspapers 

 Boston Herald, Boston, Massachusetts
 The Charlotte Post, Charlotte, North Carolina
 The Lowell Sun, Lowell, Massachusetts (previously endorsed Andrew Yang) Sentinel & Enterprise, Fitchburg, Massachusetts (previously endorsed Andrew Yang) TimesDaily'', Florence, Alabama

Notes

References

External links 
 *Noteworthy Bloomberg endorsements Ballotpedia page section

2020 United States presidential election endorsements

Lists of United States presidential candidate endorsements
Michael Bloomberg 2020 presidential campaign endorsements